Electrodeionization (EDI) is a water treatment technology that uses DC Power, ion exchange membranes, and ion exchange resin to deionize water. EDI is usually a polishing treatment to reverse osmosis (RO).  EDI differs from other RO polishing technologies such as chemically regenerated mixed beds, in that it is continuous and requires no chemical regeneration.  EDI is sometimes referred to as continuous electrodeionization (CEDI) since the electric current regenerates the resin mass continuously. The CEDI technique can achieve high purity, with product conductivity below 0.1 μS/cm and sometimes with resistivity as high as 18.2 MΩ-cm.  Electrodeionization (EDI) is a combination of three different processes.

 Electrodialysis

With a continuously applied electric DC current, both positive and negative ions are directed to the electrode that has opposing electrical charge. The electrical potential pulls anions and cations from diluting chambers, though cation or anion exchange membranes, into concentrating chambers.

 Ion exchange

The diluting chambers consist of ion exchange resin. Water flows through the resin bed and the cations and anions are attached to resin sites.  Once on the resin, the ions are continuously removed through migration mention in the electrodialysis above.

 Regeneration

Regeneration occurs by water splitting.  In a chemically regenerated mixed bed, the hydrogen (H+) of acid regenerates cation resin.  The hydroxyl (OH-) of sodium hydroxide caustic soda regenerates anion resin.  In EDI, the electrical current causes water splitting:  H2O  → H+ + OH-

Quality of the feed 

To offer all its potential, EDI feed water needs pre-treatment, usually reverse osmosis. Feed water must follow certain requirements, these parameters are fixed before to prevent damage to the equipment. Some parameters are:

 In most cases hardness of feed water must be < 1ppm as CaCO3.  In some cases hardness can be as high as 2 or 4 ppm as CaCO3.  
 Silica content (SiO2) must be < 1ppm or < 2 ppm in the CDIT thin cell modules.
 CO2 must be monitored to prevent excessive loading of anion exchange resin.
 TOC, which can foul resins and membranes
 Chlorine, ozone and other oxidizers oxidize resins and membranes and create permanent damage.

History 
To eliminate or minimize the concentration polarization phenomenon present in electrodialysis systems, electrodeionization originated in the early 1950s. Kollsman developed the first descriptions of electrodeionization in a 1953 patent and subsequently published many papers following the subject.

The technology was limited in application because of the low tolerance of total dissolved solids, hardness and organics. During the 1970s and 1980s, reverse osmosis became a preferred technology to ion exchange resin for high TDS waters. As RO gained popularity, it was determined that EDI would be a suitable polishing technology. Packaged RO and EDI systems were used to displace chemically regenerated ion exchange systems.

In 1986 and 1989, companies like Millipore, Ionpure, HOH Water Technologies, and Ionics Inc. developed electrodeionization devices. The initial devices were large, costly, and often unreliable.  In 1995, Glegg Water Conditioning introduced E-Cell brand electrodeionization. The new technology reduced cost and improved reliability, based on a modular design standard. E-Cell was also offered to many OEMS and revolutionized the industry. Competitors like Electropure and SnowPure soon followed with modular leak-free designs.

Presently, this technology is widely available from much water treatment companies, but should only be applied by experts who understand the limitations and use top-quality products.

Applications
When fed with low total dissolved solids (TDS) feed (e.g., feed purified by RO), the product can reach very high purity levels (e.g., 18 megohms/cm, Resistivity / Conductivity Measurement of Purified Water).  The ion exchange resins act to keep the ions, allowing these to be transported across the ion exchange membranes. The main applications of EDI technology, such as that supplied by Ionpure, E-cell, and SnowPure, are in electronics, pharmaceuticals, and power generation. Concerning electronics, deionized water is used to rinse components during manufacturing. The electronic chips are very small, so the components are very condensed inside. If ions are present between the components, a short circuit can occur and make the chip unusable.
Electrodeionisation systems have been applied for the removal of heavy metals from different types of wastewater such as mining, electroplating, and nuclear processes. The ions primarily present are those related to chromium, cobalt, nickel, copper and others.

Theory
An electrode in an electrochemical cell is referred to as either an anode or a cathode, a term that was coined by Michael Faraday. The anode is defined as the electrode at which electrons leave the cell and oxidation occurs, and the cathode is the electrode at which electrons enter the cell and reduction occurs. Each electrode may become either the anode or the cathode, depending on the voltage applied to the cell. A bipolar electrode is an electrode that functions as the anode of one cell and the cathode of another cell.

Each cell comprises an electrode and an electrolyte with ions that undergo either oxidation or reduction. An electrolyte is a substance containing free ions that behave as an electrically conductive medium. Because they comprise ions in solution, electrolytes are also known as ionic solutions, but molten electrolytes and solid electrolytes are also possible. They are sometimes referred to in abbreviated jargon as lytes.

Water is passed between an anode (positive electrode) and a cathode (negative electrode). Ion-selective membranes allow the positive ions to separate from the water toward the negative electrode and the negative ions toward the positive electrode. High purity deionized water results.

In situ regeneration 
When using an excess of current that is higher than the necessary for the movement of the ions. A portion of the water will be split, forming OH- and H+. This species will replace the impurity anions and cations in the resin. This process is called regeneration in situ of the resin. And because it occurs during the process itself, there is no need to stop the installation and use chemicals in other techniques.

Installation scheme 

The typical EDI installation has the following components: anode and cathode, anion exchange membrane, cation exchange membrane, and resin. The most simplified configuration comprises 3 compartments. To increase production, the number of compartments or cells can be increased.

The cations flow toward the cathode and the anions flow toward the anode. Only anions can go through the anion exchange membrane and only cations can go through the cation exchange membrane. This configuration allows anions and cations to only flow in one direction because of the membranes and the electric force, leaving the feed water free of ions (deionized water).

The concentration flows (right and left of the feed flow) are rejected and they can be wasted, recycled, or used in another process.

The purpose of the ion exchange resin is to maintain stable conductance of the feed water. Without the resins, the conductance will drop dramatically as the concentration of ions is decreasing. Such drop-off of conductance makes it very difficult to eliminate 100% of the ions, but using resins makes it possible.

See also

Electrodialysis
Ionization
Purified water
Water purification
Water treatment

References

External links
 video.
 Continuous Electrodeionization (CEDI/EDI) Ionpure CEDI Products
 Bộ lọc nước phèn
 Electrodeionization Technology
 EDI History
 Electrodeionization Systems, Electrodeionization Systems
 Advanced Electrodeionization Technology for Product Desalting, Argonne National Laboratory

Water treatment
Ions
Physical chemistry
Separation processes